Seitz may refer to:

 Seitz (surname)
 Seitz (soil), the unofficial state soil of Colorado
 Seitz decision, a 1975 arbitration ruling instrumental in ending Major League Baseball's reserve clause
 Seitz Branch, a stream in Wayne County, Missouri
 Seitz Canyon, in the Ruby Mountains of Elko County, Nevada
 Seitz Lake (Nevada), in Elko County
 4978 Seitz, an asteroid